The 2018–19 season was Dundee's fifth consecutive season in the top flight of Scottish football since their promotion at the end of the 2013–14 season. Dundee also competed in the League Cup and the Scottish Cup. On 4 May, Dundee were automatically relegated to the Championship.

Season Summary
Dundee player Paul McGowan admitted in court to spitting on a bouncer after leaving a nightclub after the previous seasons awards. Dens manager Neil McCann admitted there was "No positives" to take from the defeat in their second League Cup group match to Dunfermline Athletic in which they lost 1–0. Dundee were knocked out of the Second Round of the League Cup by Ayr United with manager Neil McCann saying the "3-0 scoreline probably flattered us." Neil McCann said it was a "sore one to take" after Dundee's loss against Hibernian, their sixth straight league loss leaving them pointless at the bottom of the league. On 16 October, McCann was sacked from his role, taking assistant manager Graham Gartland with him and leaving the club bottom of league with 7 defeats in 8 league matches. On 17 October, the club announced Jim McIntyre as their new manager. Jim would have a poor start to his stint as Dundee manager, where the team lost 4 games in a row, conceding 13 goals and scoring none in that space. Starting with a home draw against relegation rivals St Mirren, Dundee would go on an unbeaten streak, coming back from 2 goals down to draw at Easter Road and earning a decisive 4–0 victory over Hamilton Accies. However, they failed to win another match until after the winter break at Hearts. Dundee also crashed out of the Scottish Cup with a 3–0 defeat in a replay away to Queen of the South. Dundee ended the pre-split fixtures by losing 7 matches, the joint worst run throughout the League season. This losing run continued after the split, and the club were relegated on 4 May in a 1–0 loss to Hamilton Academical with ex-Dundee United player Tony Andreu scoring the winner in the 83rd minute after a penalty was conceded by Ryan McGowan. This loss marked their tenth in a row, the worst run of defeats in the Premiership in 15 years. On 12 May, Jim McIntyre and assistant manager Jimmy Boyle were sacked by the club. Ex-player and reserve team coach James McPake was named as interim manager for the final game against St Mirren. Darren O'Dea would also play his final professional game against St Mirren, but would be sent off just 22 minutes into the game, in what would finish as a 2–3 defeat.

Competitions

Premiership

Scottish Cup

League Cup

Group stage

Knockout stage

Squad statistics

Appearances

|-
|colspan="14"|Players away from the club on loan:

|-
|colspan="14"|Players who left the club during the season:

|}

Goal scorers

Club statistics

League table

Group D Table

Results by round

Transfers

Players in

Players out

Loans in

Loans out

See also
 List of Dundee F.C. seasons

Notes

References

Dundee F.C. seasons
Dundee